Jazzanova is a German Berlin-based DJ/producer collective consisting of Alexander Barck, Claas Brieler, Jürgen von Knoblauch, Roskow Kretschmann, Stefan Leisering, and Axel Reinemer. Formed in 1995, the group's music is characterized by nu jazz, chill-out, as well as Latin jazz styles. They founded the record label Sonar Kollektiv in 1997.

They also have a side-project, Extended Spirit and gained recognition as remixers for acts such as Marschmellows, Ian Pooley, Incognito, 4Hero, MJ Cole and Masters at Work.

Jazzanova released their second studio album Of All the Things, on 21 October 2008. Funkhaus Studio Sessions was released in May 2012 with Paul Randolph on vocals.  Jazzanova announced the expected release of a new studio album, The Pool, in June 2018.

Discography

Albums
 In Between (2002)
 Of All the Things (2008)
 Funkhaus Studio Sessions (2012)
 The Pool (2018)
 Strata Records: The sound of Detroit. Reimanginated by Jazzanova (2022)

Compilation albums
 The Remixes 1997-2000 (2000)
 Soon (2002)
 That Night (2002)
 Remixed (2003)
 Mixing (2004)
 Glow and Glare / Dance the Dance / Let Your Heart Be Free (Ame and Atjazz remixes) (2005)
 The Remixes 2002-2005 (2005)
 Blue Note Trip: Lookin Back/Movin on (2005)
 Blue Note Trip: Scrambled/Mashed (2006)
 Broad Casting (2006)
 Paz e Futebol (2006)
 Boom Clicky Boom Clack (single) (2006)
 Belle et Fou (2007)
 The Remixes 1997-2000 (2017)

Compilations appearances
 Saint-Germain-des-Prés Café
 Future Sounds of Jazz
 Bossa Mundo
 City Lounge - Berlin
 Gilles Peterson Worldwide 2 Volume 2
 Ultra Chilled 01
 Code 4109 (mixed by DJ Krush)
 Café del Mar - Best of Chillout & Sunset Music From Ibiza Volume 11
 Kajmere Sound Recordings - Impeach the President
 Spliffen Sie English
 DJ-Kicks: Thievery Corporation

Remixes
 Soul Quality Quartet - "Toda Tersafeira" (Jazzanova Dub) - Soul Quality Quartet EP - Sonar Kollektiv (1999)
 Azymuth - "Amazon Adventure" (Jazzanova Remix) - Off Limits - Sonar Kollektiv (1999)
 Tate's Place - "Burning" (Jazzanova Remix) - Off Limits - Dynamite Joint Recordings (1999)
 Trüby Trio - "Carajillo" (Jazzanova's Chant for Leo Mix) - Off Limits 2 - Compost Records (2000)
 Soul Quality Quartet - "Toda Tersafeira" (Jazzanova Rework) - Sonar Kollektiv 2 - Sonar Kollektiv (2003)
 Nuspirit Helsinki - "Honest" (Jazzanova's Honestly Yours Remix) - Sonar Kollektiv (2004)
 MJ Cole - "Sincere" (Jazzanova Sincerely Yours Mix) feat. Nova Caspar & Jay Dee - The Remixes 1997-2000 - Mercury Records Ltd. (2005)
 Soul Quality Quartet - "Toda Tersafeira" (Jazzanova Rework) - The Remixes 1997-2000 - Dialog Recordings/Sonar Kollektiv (2005)
 Visit Venus "Planet of Breaks" (Jazzanova Mix) - The Remixes 1997-2000 - Yo Mama's Records Co. (2005)
 Tate's Place "Burnin'" (Jazzanova Mix) - The Remixes 1997-2000 - Dynamite Joint Recordings (2005)
 Balanco "Metti Una Sera a Cena" (Jazzanova Mix)
 Ian Pooley "What's Your Number" (Jazzanova Renumber) - The Remixes 1997-2000 - V2 Records GmbH (2005)
 Liquid Lounge "Complete Life" (Jazzanova Mix) - The Remixes 1997-2000 - Pantounge Records (2005)
 Ursula Rucker "Circe" (Jazzanova Mix) - The Remixes 1997-2000 - Guidance Records (2005)
 Ski "Fifths" (Jazzanova 6 Sickth Mix) - The Remixes 1997-2000 - Sony Music (2005)
 Soul Bossa Trio "Words of Love" (Re-Loved By Jazzanova) - The Remixes 1997-2000 - Wildjumbo Tokumo Japan Communications (2005)
 Azymuth "Amazon Adventure" (Jazzanova Mix) - The Remixes 1997-2000 - Far Out Records (2005)
 United Future Organization "Friends ... We'll Be" (Jazzanova Mix) - The Remixes 1997-2000, Mercury Music Entertainment Co Ltd. (2005)
 Har-You Percussion Group "Welcome to the Party" (Jazzanova Mix) - The Remixes 1997-2000 - Ubiquity Records (2005)
 Karma "High Priestess" (Jazzanova Mix) - The Remixes 1997-2000 - Spectrum Works (2005)
 Incognito "Get into My Groove" (Jazzanova Re-Groove) - The Remixes 1997-2000 - Universal Classics and Jazz (2005)
 Trüby Trio "Carajillo" (Jazzanova's "Chant for Leo" Mix) - The Remixes 1997-2000 - Compost Records (2005)
 Men from Nile "Watch Them Come!!!" (Jazzanova Remix) - The Remixes 1997-2000 - Underground Therapy (2005)
 Marshmellows "Soulpower" (Jazzanova's Straight Dub Mix) - The Remixes 1997-2000 - Infracom (2005)
 4Hero "We Who Are Not as Others" (Jazzanova Mix) - The Remixes 1997-2000 - Talkin Loud/Mercury Records Ltd. (2005)
 Free Design "Lullaby" (J-Nova Remix) - The Remixes 2002-2005 - Zynczak Associates (2005)
 Nuspirit Helsinki "Honest" (Jazzanova's Honestly Yours Remix) - The Remixes 2002-2005 - Sonar Kollektiv (2005)
 Calexico (Band) "Black Heart" (Jazzanova's White Soul Dub) - The Remixes 2002-2005 - City Slang / Label / EMI (2005)
 Marcos Valle "Besteiras do Amor" (Jazzanova Remix) - The Remixes 2002-2005 - Far Out Recordings (2005)
 Eddie Gale "Song of Will" (Jazzanova Rhythm Happening) - The Remixes 2002-2005 - Blue Note / EMI (2005)
 Shaun Escoffery "Let It Go" (Jazzanova Remix) - The Remixes 2002-2005 - Oyster Music Ltd. (2005)
 Status IV "You Ain't Really Down" (Jazzanova's Hey Baby Remix) - The Remixes 2002-2005 - Sonar Kollektiv (2005)
 Masters at Work feat. Roy Ayers "Our Time Is Coming" (Jazzanova's Guestlist Mix) - The Remixes 2002-2005 - MAW (2005)
 Heavy "Wonderlove (For Minnie)" (Jazzanova Remix) - The Remixes 2002-2005 - Kindered Spirit (2005)
 Status IV "You Ain't Really Down" (Jazzanova's Hey Baby Beats) - You Ain't Really Down - Sonar Kollektiv (2005)
 Status IV "Hey Baby!" - You Ain't Really Down - Sonar Kollektiv (2005)
 Fat Freddy's Drop "Breathe Easy Beats" - Flashback (Jazzanova Remixes) - Sonar Kollektiv (2006)
 Fat Freddys Drop "Flashback" (Jazzanova's Breathe Easy Mix) - Flashback (Jazzanova Remixes) - Sonar Kollektiv (2006)
 Fat Freddys Drop "Flashback" (Jazzanova's Mashed Bag Mix) - Ten Years, Who Cares? - Sonar Kollektiv (2007)

DJ-mixes
 Circles - Brownswood (1998)
 Sound of the City Vol. 3 - Berlin - Universal Jazz (1999)
 Jazzanova...Mixing - Sonar Kollektiv (2004)
 Blue Note Trip: Lookin' Back / Movin' On - Jazzanova - Blue Note (2005)
 Blue Note Trip: Scrambled / Mashed - Jazzanova - Blue Note (2006)
 Jazzanova ...Broad Casting - Sonar Kollektiv (2006)
 Jazzanova & Dirk Rumpff ... Broad Casting from OFFtrack Radio - Sonar Kollektiv (2007)
 Southport Weekender Volume 7 (Disc 1) - Concept Records (2008)
 Secret Love vol. 5 - Sonar Kollektiv (2008)
 Neu Jazz - Sonar Kollektiv (2008)
 SK200 - Sonar Kollektiv (2008)

References

External links
 Jazzanova official website
 Jazzanova on the Sonar Kollektiv website
 Jazzanova on the Compost Records website.
 Interview with Jazzanova on Clubbity.
 RBMA Radio On Demand: Train Wreck Mix - Jazzanova (Sonar Kollektiv, Berlin) on Red Bull Music Academy website.
 Jazzanova Radio Shows

 

German musical groups
Musical groups established in 1995
Compost Records artists
Sonar Kollektiv artists
Ropeadope Records artists
Music of the African diaspora
Chill-out musicians
Downtempo musicians
Nu jazz musicians